Dominique Bijotat (born 3 January 1961) is a French football manager and former professional player who played as a midfielder. He obtained eight international caps (no goals) for the France national team during the 1980s.

Club career
Bijotat was born in Chassignolles, Indre. Most of his career was spent with AS Monaco, playing there in two separate periods 1976–1987 and 1988–1991. He also spent one season with Bordeaux and eventually ended his playing career at Châteauroux.

International career
He was a member of the national team that won the gold medal at the 1984 Summer Olympics in Los Angeles.

Coaching career
After the recent home defeat against Ajaccio, the coach has quit Ligue 2 club LB Châteauroux, the team was in 16th place.

On 4 June 2010, FC Metz officials hired the former Châteauroux coach with the objective of leading the team back to Ligue 1 within two years.

His spell ended up in a nightmare as Metz was relegated in May 2012 in National for the first time, the French third division, before the last game of the season. He was even asked by the Chairman not to coach the team for the last game at home.

References

External links
 
 

1961 births
Living people
French footballers
France international footballers
Association football midfielders
AS Monaco FC players
FC Girondins de Bordeaux players
LB Châteauroux players
Ligue 1 players
Ligue 2 players
Olympic footballers of France
Olympic gold medalists for France
Footballers at the 1984 Summer Olympics
French football managers
AC Ajaccio managers
FC Sochaux-Montbéliard managers
LB Châteauroux managers
FC Metz managers
Olympic medalists in football
Medalists at the 1984 Summer Olympics
Sportspeople from Indre
Footballers from Centre-Val de Loire